Jordan Rashad Holland (born March 15, 1995) is an American former professional football cornerback. He is the son of outside linebackers coach and run game specialist Johnny Holland for the San Francisco 49ers. He played college football at Prairie View A&M University in Texas and attended Elkins High School in Missouri City, Texas. He has also been a member of the Billings Wolves and Cleveland Gladiators.

Professional career
On August 26, 2019, Holland signed with the San Francisco 49ers. He was waived during final roster cuts on August 30, 2019.

References

Living people
1995 births
American football defensive backs
Canadian football defensive backs
American players of Canadian football
Prairie View A&M Panthers football players
Billings Wolves players
Cleveland Gladiators players
Edmonton Elks players
San Antonio Commanders players
Players of American football from Texas
People from Missouri City, Texas
San Francisco 49ers players